William Trewynnard (by 1495 – 1549), of Trewinnard, Cornwall, was an English politician.

He was a Member (MP) of the Parliament of England for Helston in 1542.

He was robbed and his estates despoiled during the Prayer Book Rebellion in 1549, when he was mortally wounded by rebels when trying to shelter at St Michael's Mount.

References

15th-century births
1549 deaths
English MPs 1542–1544
People from St Erth
Members of the pre-1707 English Parliament for constituencies in Cornwall